Douglas Peter Savant (born June 21, 1964) is an American actor, known for his roles as Matt Fielding in the Fox prime time soap opera Melrose Place (1992–97), Tom Scavo in ABC comedy-drama Desperate Housewives (2004–12), and as Sgt. O'Neal in Godzilla (1998).

Early life 
Savant was born and raised in Burbank, California. He attended University of California, Los Angeles, but left before graduating to pursue his acting career.

Career
Savant began his career appearing in teen comedy films Secret Admirer and Teen Wolf in 1985, and the following year appeared in horror film Trick or Treat. From 1986 to 1987, he had a recurring role as a younger version of Mac McKenzie (played by Kevin Dobson) in the CBS prime time soap opera Knots Landing. He was paired with future Desperate Housewives co-star Nicollette Sheridan, who played a younger version of the Anne Matheson character portrayed by Michelle Phillips. In 1988, he co-starred in erotic thriller film Masquerade alongside Rob Lowe and Kim Cattrall

From 1992 to 1997, Savant starred as Matt Fielding in the Fox prime time soap opera Melrose Place, a role that was notable for being one of the first mainstream openly gay characters on television. However, his role was censored greatly by the network - notably a kiss between Matt and guest star Ty Miller during the season two finale was edited out at the last minute by FOX. Savant left the series after five seasons and, a year later, his character was killed off-screen in a car crash. In 1998, he appeared in monster film Godzilla playing Sgt. O'Neal, and the following years had guest-starring roles on The Outer Limits, Profiler, Firefly, JAG, Nip/Tuck, NYPD Blue, and CSI: Crime Scene Investigation. In 2004, he had a four-episode arc on 24.

In 2004, Savant was cast as Tom Scavo in the ABC comedy-drama series, Desperate Housewives. In the first season (2004–05), Tom was originally credited as a recurring role throughout Season 1, but became credited as a series regular in Season 2. Married to Lynette Scavo (Felicity Huffman), he was out of town regularly on business. Viewer response to Savant and his character led the producers to contract him as a series regular from season two onwards, and Tom and Lynette were portrayed as the most stable couple on the series. The series ended in 2012, and the following years, Savant had guest-starring roles in a number of shows, including Hot in Cleveland, Criminal Minds, 9-1-1 and NCIS.

Personal life
In May 1998, he married his Melrose Place co-star Laura Leighton. They have two children together: Jack (born October 10, 2000) and Lucy (born June 9, 2005). Savant also has two children from a previous marriage whom Leighton helped raise, Arianna (born January 17, 1992) and Madeline (born July 20, 1993).

Filmography

Film

Television

References

External links
 
 Doug Savant 2007 Interview on Sidewalks Entertainment

1964 births
Living people
20th-century American male actors
21st-century American male actors
American male film actors
American male television actors
Male actors from Burbank, California